Last Night Blues is an album by the blues musician Lightnin' Hopkins, with Sonny Terry, recorded in 1960 and released on the Bluesville label the following year.

Reception

AllMusic stated: "Lightnin' Hopkins may be Texas's most distinctive and influential blues export. His easy, fluid fingerpicking and witty, extemporaneous storytelling are always a delight, and his performances on Last Night Blues are no exception. The album is spare and acoustic, with Hopkins's voice and guitar accompanied by minimal percussion and Sonny Terry's harmonica ...  this dynamite disc represents what the blues should be: stripped-down, soulful, and full of truth". The Penguin Guide to Blues Recordings awarded the album 3 stars, noting: "Sonny Terry's contributions to Last Night Blues is entirely and discreetly responsive".

Track listing
All compositions by Sam "Lightnin'" Hopkins except where noted
 "Rocky Mountain" – 4:57
 "Got to Move Your Baby" – 4:01
 "So Sorry to Leave You" – 4:21
 "Take a Trip With Me" – 5:04
 "Last Night Blues" – 5:16
 "Lightnin's Stroke" – 4:55
 "Hard to Love a Woman" – 4:00
 "Conversation Blues" (Lightnin' Hopkins, Sonny Terry) – 3:50

Personnel

Performance
Lightnin' Hopkins – guitar, vocals
Sonny Terry – harmonica, vocals
Leonard Gaskin – bass
Belton Evans – drums

Production
 The Sound of America – producer
 Rudy Van Gelder – engineer

References

Lightnin' Hopkins albums
Sonny Terry albums
1961 albums
Bluesville Records albums
Albums recorded at Van Gelder Studio